William Langewiesche (pronounced:long-gah-vee-shuh) (born June 12, 1955) is an American author and journalist who was also a professional airplane pilot for many years.  Since 2019 he has been a writer at large for The New York Times Magazine. Prior to that he was a correspondent for The Atlantic and Vanity Fair magazines for twenty-nine years. He is the author of nine books and the winner of two National Magazine Awards.

Career

William Langewiesche is currently a writer at large for The New York Times Magazine. From 2006-2019 he was an international correspondent for Vanity Fair magazine. Prior to that, he was the national correspondent for The Atlantic Monthly magazine where he was nominated for eight consecutive National Magazine Awards. He has written articles covering a wide range of topics from shipbreaking, wine critics, the Space Shuttle Columbia disaster, modern ocean piracy, nuclear proliferation, and the World Trade Center cleanup.

Langewiesche grew up in Princeton, New Jersey, and attended college in California, where he received a degree in cultural anthropology from Stanford University. He spent much of his time on various jobs flying airplanes, a skill he had acquired because of his family background.
 
After college Langewiesche moved to New York City and went to work as a writer for Flying, a large-circulation publication for general aviation pilots. While there he wrote technical reports on the flight characteristics of various airplanes, and profiles of people.  In his mid-twenties, he quit the job in order to write books—one non-fiction, and two novels—none of which was published.

He continued to travel and write, supporting himself by flying airplanes. The travels eventually took Langewiesche to the most remote parts of the Sahara desert and sub-Saharan West Africa. This became the subject of a cover story for The Atlantic Monthly, in 1991, and later of a book titled Sahara Unveiled. The Atlantic sent Langewiesche to many parts of the world and increasingly into conflict zones. In 2006, while living in Baghdad to cover the Iraq war, Langewiesche left The Atlantic and went to work for Vanity Fair.

After the attacks of 9/11, Langewiesche was the only journalist given full unrestricted access to the World Trade Center site.  He stayed there for nearly six months and produced "American Ground", a serialized report in The Atlantic Monthly. "American Ground" became a New York Times national bestselling book.

Langewiesche's 2007 article "Jungle Law" involved him in the controversy surrounding Chevron Corporation and Steven R. Donziger.

Life
Langewiesche is the son of Wolfgang Langewiesche, author of Stick and Rudder. He lives in New York and France.

Awards

Winner
 2007 National Magazine Award for Public Interest for Rules of Engagement
 2002 National Magazine Award for Reporting for The Crash of EgyptAir 990

Finalist
2008 National Magazine Award for Reporting for City of Fear
2007 Michael Kelly Award.
2006 National Magazine Award for Reporting for The Wrath of Khan
2005 Lettre Ulysses Award for The Outlaw Sea
2005 National Magazine Award for Feature Writing for A Sea Story
2004 National Magazine Award for Reporting for Columbia's Last Flight
2004 Lettre Ulysses Award for the Art of Reportage for American Ground: Unbuilding the World Trade Center
2003 National Magazine Award for Reporting for American Ground: Unbuilding the World Trade Center
2002 National Book Critic's Circle Award for American Ground: Unbuilding The World Trade Center
2001 National Magazine Award for Profiles for The Million-Dollar Nose
2000 National Magazine Award for Profiles for Eden: A Gated Community
1999 National Magazine Award for Reporting for The Lessons of ValuJet 592
1992 National Magazine Award for Feature Writing for The World in Its Extreme

Bibliography

Books

Essays and reporting
1990s
 
 
 
 
 
 
 
 
 
2000s
 
 
 
 
 
 
 
 
 
 
 
 
 
 
 
 
 
 
 
 
 
 
 
 
 
 
 
 
 
 
 
 
 
2010s
 
 
 
 
 
 
 
 
 
 
 
 
 
 
 
 
 

 

2020s

References

External links

San Francisco Chronicle Feature Profile
William Langewiesche at The New New Journalism website
William Langewiesche at FSG
William Langewiesche biosketch at the Atlantic Monthly website
William Langewiesche Ulysses Award bio
Audio/video recordings of William Langewiesche discussing his book The Atomic Bazaar; from the University of Chicago's World Beyond the Headlines series

Interviews
Interview with Wendy Murray Dec 1, 2013
Interview with Neal Thompson March 8, 2010
Interview with Media Bistro July 25, 2007
Video interview with Stephen Colbert  May 14, 2007
Video interview with Charlie Rose September 10, 2002
The Eventualist: William Langewiesche on The Atomic Bazaar and Facing our Worst Fear, by Nancy Rommelmann July 25, 2007

1955 births
Living people
American aviators
American male journalists
American non-fiction writers
The Atlantic (magazine) people
American aviation writers
Writers from New Jersey
People from Princeton, New Jersey
Stanford University alumni